The 1940 United States presidential election in Vermont  took place on November 5, 1940, as part of the 1940 United States presidential election which was held throughout all contemporary 48 states. Voters chose three representatives, or electors to the Electoral College, who voted for president and vice president.

Vermont voted for the Republican nominee, corporate lawyer Wendell Willkie of New York, over the Democratic nominee, incumbent President Franklin D. Roosevelt of New York. Willkie's running mate was Senate Minority Leader Charles L. McNary of Oregon, while Roosevelt ran with Secretary of Agriculture Henry A. Wallace of Iowa.

Willkie took 54.78% of the vote, to Roosevelt's 44.92%, a margin of 9.86%.

Vermont historically was a bastion of liberal Northeastern Republicanism, and by 1940 the Green Mountain State had gone Republican in every presidential election since the founding of the Republican Party. From 1856 to 1936, Vermont had had the longest streak of voting Republican of any state, having never voted Democratic before, and this tradition continued in 1940.

Vermont had been one of only two states (along with nearby Maine) to reject Democrat Franklin D. Roosevelt in all 4 of his presidential campaigns, even in the nationwide Democratic landslides of 1932 and 1936.

However 1940 would prove to be Roosevelt's high point in Vermont, and in New England as a whole, even as the rest of the nation shifted toward the GOP. Roosevelt improved on his previous showings in Vermont, coming within just under 10 percentage points of winning the state, the only time he ever got within single digits of a Republican opponent in the state. The results in Maine, the only state to have joined Vermont in voting Republican in 1936, showed a similar but even more dramatic swing toward FDR, with Willkie only holding onto Maine by a narrow 51—49 margin. Roosevelt's gain in Vermont and other New England states, in an election when Willkie carried almost seven hundred counties that the President had won during his landslide four years beforehand, was due to support in the region for helping Britain and France during World War II.

Whereas Vermont had been the most Republican state in the union in the 1930s, a strong swing against Roosevelt in the Midwest pushed Vermont into being only the fifth most Republican state after South Dakota, Nebraska, Kansas and North Dakota, although it still registered as a strong twenty percent more Republican than the national average.

Willkie carried ten of the state's 14 counties, breaking 60% in 6. However, the three northwestern counties of Vermont had been Democratic enclaves in an otherwise Republican state throughout the 1930s and 1940s, and Roosevelt once again won Chittenden County, Franklin County and Grand Isle County for the Democrats. Roosevelt also managed to carry for the first time rural Essex County in the northeast of the state, being the first Democrat to do so since Martin Van Buren in 1836.

Results

Results by county

See also
 United States presidential elections in Vermont

References

Vermont
1940
1940 Vermont elections